Kurdyukovskoye is a rural locality (a selo) in Chernyayevsky Selsoviet, Kizlyarsky District, Republic of Dagestan, Russia. The population was 225 as of 2010. There are 2 streets.

Geography 
Kurdyukovskoye is located 26 km northeast of Kizlyar (the district's administrative centre) by road. Novovladimirskoye and Burumbay are the nearest rural localities.

Nationalities 
Dargins, Avars, Nogais and Russians live there.

References 

Rural localities in Kizlyarsky District